Concilium is an academic journal of Catholic theology. It was established in 1965 by the publishing firm T&T Clark and is published five times a year. The journal was established by Anton van den Boogaard, Paul Brand, Yves Congar, Hans Küng, Johann Baptist Metz, Karl Rahner, Henri de Lubac, Hans Urs von Balthasar, and Edward Schillebeeckx. Balthasar and de Lubac later resigned and founded Communio, which became the rival journal of Concilium.

It is published in six languages: Croatian, English, German, Italian, Portuguese, and Spanish.

Concilium aims at promoting theological discussion in the "spirit of Vatican II" from which it was born. It is a Catholic journal, but is open to other Christian theological traditions and non-Christian faiths.

Concilium was awarded the Herbert Haag Prize for 2015 by the Herbert Haag Foundation for Freedom in the Church.

See also 
 Aggiornamento
 List of theological journals

References

External links
 
 English language edition website

Catholic studies journals
Publications established in 1965
Multilingual journals
5 times per year journals